Russell Henry Chittenden (18 February 1856 – 26 December 1943) was an American physiological chemist.  He conducted pioneering research in the biochemistry of digestion and nutrition.

Early life and education
He was born in New Haven, Connecticut in 1856, graduated from the Sheffield Scientific School at Yale in 1875, studied in Heidelberg in 1878-79, and received his doctorate at Yale in physiological chemistry in 1880.  He was of English ancestry, his first ancestor in America being Major William Chittenden, an officer in the English army, who, having resigned, came to America from Cranbrook, Kent, with his wife, Joanne Sheaffe, in 1639, and settled in Guilford Connecticut.  Ancestors of the professor on both his father's and his mother's side fought in the Revolutionary War.

Career
He was professor of physiological chemistry at Yale from 1882 to 1922.  He was director of the Sheffield Scientific School from 1898-1922. He was also professor of physiology at the Yale School of Medicine starting in 1900.  From 1898 to 1903 he was also a lecturer on physiological chemistry at Columbia University, New York.  He was a founding member of the American Physiological Society in 1887 and served as its president from 1895 to 1904. He was a member of the Connecticut Academy of Arts and Sciences. In 1904, he was elected as a member of the American Philosophical Society.

He was the author of Digestive Proteolysis and Physiological Economy in Nutrition (New York, 1905).  During World War I, Professor Chittenden was a member of the Advisory Committee on Food Utilization and also a member of the Executive Committee of the National Research Council. He is often called the "father of American biochemistry."  His home in New Haven is a National Historic Landmark.

Chittenden advocated a low-protein diet.

Publications

Physiological Economy in Nutrition (1904)
The Nutrition of Man (1907)

References

Sources
 Chittenden at Yale Medical School
 G.R. C., 1944. Russell Henry Chittenden, February 18, 1856 - December 26, 1943. An appreciation. The Journal of Nutrition, 28 (1), 2-6. Article
 Lewis, H.B., 1944. Russell Henry Chittenden, (1856 - 1943). The Journal of Biological Chemistry, 153 (2), 339-342. Article
 Vickery, H.B., 1944. Russell Henry Chittenden, 1856 - 1943. National Academy of Sciences, Biographical Memoirs, 24, 59-104. Article

External links
 
 National Academy of Sciences Biographical Memoir

American food writers
Yale School of Engineering & Applied Science alumni
Scientists from New Haven, Connecticut
American chemists
1856 births
1943 deaths
Diet food advocates
Yale School of Medicine faculty
Members of the American Philosophical Society